Lestari Moerdijat who is also known as Mbak Rerie (born 30 November 1967) is an Indonesian politician of Javanese descent, who has served as Deputy Speaker of the People's Consultative Assembly of Indonesia since 3 October 2019.

References 

Living people
1967 births
Women legislative deputy speakers
21st-century Indonesian women politicians

University of Indonesia alumni
Pelita Harapan University alumni
Javanese people
Nasdem Party politicians
Members of the People's Representative Council, 2019